1132 Hollandia, provisional designation , is a stony asteroid from the middle region of the asteroid belt, approximately 27 kilometers in diameter. It was discovered on 13 September 1929, by Dutch astronomer Hendrik van Gent at Leiden Southern Station, annex to the Johannesburg Observatory in South Africa. It was named for the region Holland in the Netherlands.

Classification and orbit 

Hollandia is an assumed stony S-type asteroid. It orbits the Sun at a distance of 1.9–3.4 AU once every 4 years and 5 months (1,609 days). Its orbit has an eccentricity of 0.278 and an inclination of 7° with respect to the ecliptic. The body's observation arc begins with its official discovery observation as no precoveries were taken and no prior identifications were made.

Physical characteristics 

Between 2003 and 2014, three rotational lightcurves of Hollandia were obtained from photometric observations taken by French amateur astronomer René Roy, Jason Sauppe at Oakley Observatory and Maurice Clark at TTU's Preston Gott Observatory. Lightcurve analysis gave a rotation period between 5.360 and 5.568 hours with a brightness variation of 0.15–0.35 magnitude.

According to the surveys carried out by the Japanese Akari satellite, and NASA's Wide-field Infrared Survey Explorer with its subsequent NEOWISE mission, Hollandia measures between 20.48 and 27.727 kilometers in diameter, and its surface has an albedo between 0.086 and 0.135. The Collaborative Asteroid Lightcurve Link assumes an albedo of 0.10 – a compromise value that lies in between the albedos for carbonaceous (0.057) and for stony (0.20) asteroids – and calculates a diameter of 25.32 kilometers using an absolute magnitude of 11.1.

Naming 

This asteroid was named after the Latin name for The Netherlands, a region in the European Union. Naming citation was first published by Paul Herget in The Names of the Minor Planets in 1955.

References

External links 
 Asteroid Lightcurve Database (LCDB), query form (info )
 Dictionary of Minor Planet Names, Google books
 Asteroids and comets rotation curves, CdR – Observatoire de Genève, Raoul Behrend
 Discovery Circumstances: Numbered Minor Planets (1)-(5000) – Minor Planet Center
 
 

001132
Discoveries by Hendrik van Gent
Named minor planets
19290913